Cyril Cartwright may refer to:
 Cyril Cartwright (cyclist) (1924–2015), British cyclist
 Cyril Cartwright (civil servant) (1920–1943), British colonial service administrator